Games for Parents and Other Children is a 1975 Australian TV movie.

References

External links

1975 television films
1975 films
Australian drama television films
1970s English-language films
1970s Australian films